Manuel Mas Ribo (February 26, 1946 – July 30, 2001) was the foreign minister of Andorra from 1994 to 1997.

Ribo was born in Barcelona and moved to Andorra. He graduated from the University of Barcelona becoming a lawyer and political writer.

He was involved in the publication Tele/Estel.

Ribo was General Counsel and Secretary General of the General Council of Andorra, then served as member from 1994 to 1995 before entering cabinet. After politics he became a diplomat in the Holy See 1998 to 2001 and Ireland from 1999 to 2001. Ribo remained a diplomat when he died in Andorra.

References

1946 births
2001 deaths
Foreign Ministers of Andorra
Ambassadors of Andorra to the Holy See
University of Barcelona alumni
Andorran lawyers
Andorran diplomats
20th-century lawyers